Sekolah Menengah Sains Selangor (abbreviated SMSS) is one of three fully residential schools (Sekolah Berasrama Penuh) in  Kuala Lumpur, Malaysia. Established in 1973 under the Second Malaysia Plan to comply with Malaysian New Economic Policy, the school is located about a small hill in Bandar Tun Razak, overlooking the scenic Permaisuri Lake. In 2011, the school was awarded the Sekolah Berprestasi Tinggi or High Performance School title, awarded to schools in Malaysia that have met stringent criteria including academic achievement, strength of alumni, international recognition, network, and linkages. In the year 2013, the school managed to produce 84 straight A's students out of 120 with GPS 1.06 to be the best schools in Kuala Lumpur. The school continue to strive and produce great results in the public examination in the following years.

History

Sekolah Menengah Sains Selangor is actually located within the boundaries of the Federal Territory of Kuala Lumpur, despite what its name suggests. It is one of the earlier SM Sains schools in the country, hence its name bearing or representing the State of Selangor, prior to the formation of the Federal Territory of Kuala Lumpur.

SMSS is a co-ed school, with students from all the states in Malaysia. The pioneer batch of students which were made up of Form 1 and 4 started in 1973 temporarily placed for a year at three other different schools in High School Kelang, High School Kajang, Sek. Men. Sultan Abdul Aziz, Kajang for the first formers. Meanwhile, the form four students were temporarily placed in Sekolah Alam Shah and Sek. Men KGV, Taiping. They were reunited at the new school in 1974 as Form 2 and 5 students. Later intakes were mostly from Form 1 based on their UPSR excellence, with a trickle coming in at Form 4 based on their PMR results.

After more than 34 years of establishment, SMSS now stands tall and proud alongside other more established SBPs like its own sibling rivals like Sekolah Menengah Sains Tengku Muhammad Faris Petra and Sekolah Menengah Sains Raja Tun Azlan Shah. They find themselves locking horns with each other during yearly competitions such as rugby, hockey, debate, wind orchestra and other events organized by the SBP Sector under MOE. Needless to say, Sekolah Menengah Sains Selangor has won their fair share of these competitions, and they would have given a more than worthy challenge for their opponents. The school have been an off-site team challenge for MasterChef Malaysia season 2.

In 2013, in conjunction with the school 40 years celebration, the school were honoured to host the Fully Residential School Excellence Day, while the school also hosted FRSIS (Fully Residential Schools International Symposium) in 2016.

Location
Situated strategically on top of a small hill in Bandar Tun Razak, Kuala Lumpur; Sekolah Menengah Sains Selangor has one of the most fascinating views overlooking the scenic Permaisuri lake. Its main arch is directly opposite of the Kuala Lumpur Football Stadium, which is in turn adjacent to the Kuala Lumpur Sports Complex and Kuala Lumpur Swimming Complex.  It also enjoys having the company of other schools, such as Sekolah Menengah Sains Alam Shah or ASIS, which have replaced the old site of Sekolah Sultan Alam Shah in 2003, Sekolah Menengah Teknik Kuala Lumpur being the oldest technical school in Malaysia  that was founded in 1926, Sekolah Menengah Kebangsaan Seri Permaisuri and Sekolah Menengah Kebangsaan Cheras as its immediate neighbours. Pusat Perubatan Universiti Kebangsaan Malaysia is also conveniently in the vicinity.

List of Principals
1973 – 1976 - M.P. Prabhakar

1976 – 1982 - Ibrahim bin Yahaya

1982 – 1984 - Shuib bin Dahaban

1984 – 1987 - Zakaria bin Puteh

1987 – 1990 - Tn. Hj. Abdul Raof bin Hussin

1990 – 1993 - Tn. Hj. Masram bin Hj. Mohd Som

1994 – 1997 - Tn. Hj. Mohd Zubir bin Hj. Mohd Mustafa

1997 – 2000 - Mohd Baharin bin Harun

2000 – 2003 - Amran bin Maskor

2003 – 2004 - Tn. Hj. Mohd Radzi bin Abd Jabar (AMP)

2004 – 2009 - Tn. Hj. Mohd Ardani bin Yunos

2009 – 2013 - Tn. Hj. Nor Paizin bin Ibrahim

2014 – 2015 - Tn. Hj. Juahir bin Mondakir

2015 – 2021 - Rosnah binti Osman (DSM)

2022 – now  - En Zulkipli bin Abd Latib

Students Life
This school is well known for its strong rugby prowess. After 40 years of establishment, the school has won more than 100 national championships, including 43 times state's champion, 4 times Fully Residential School Rugby 10's and 5 times being crowned as ANSARA Tens Rugby Championship. The school alumnus is known as SMS Old Boys while the rugby alumnus team is SMS Old Boys Rugby Club. "From Boys to Gentleman", the book which traces back the school's rugby achievements for 40 years, were launched by Ian Fleming Gordon, the school own "Father and Grandfather of Rugby". The school is also notable with being part of Malaysian Super Six Schools Rugby, which is a yearly rugby union  a league that is held in purpose to crown the best school rugby team in Malaysia. The league were invitational, with all the six schools (SMSS, SAS, STAR's Cobratasha, SDAR's Lions, MCKK's All Blacks and SEMASHUR's Zealord) had astonishing records in various school rugby competitions.

The school is active in other sports too such as hockey and basketball. It has a high-performance wind orchestra team entitled The Renaissance that competes in the national SBP Wind Orchestra competitions. In 2006, The Renaissance was awarded the Bronze Award during the 2006 SBP Wind Orchestra Competition. As time passed by, the achievement had improved until it got 2nd place in Finale Wind Orchestra 2010 and finally, in 2012, being crowned as national champion. In 2011, the school band have been featured in a flashmob style, reality programme, Refleksi Orkestra in conjunction with Orkestra RTM 50 Golden Jubilee.

References

External links
 

Educational institutions established in 1973
1973 establishments in Malaysia
Co-educational boarding schools